Abim District is a district in Northern Uganda. It is named after its 'chief town', Abim, where the district headquarters are located.

Location
Abim District is bordered by Kotido District to the north and east, Napak District to the southeast and south, Otuke District to the southwest and Agago District to the west.
The coordinates of the district are:02 44N, 33 40E.

Overview
Abim District became functional on 1 July 2006. Prior to that, it was known as Labwor County in Kotido District. The district is composed of five sub-counties and one town council, Abim Town Council. The district is part of the Karamoja sub-region, home to an estimated one million Karimojong. The sub-region consists of the following districts: 1. Abim District 2. Amudat District 3. Kaabong District 4. Kotido District 5. Moroto District 6. Nakapiripirit District and 7. Napak District. Abim District has got a wet and dry woodland savannah type of climate, characterized by an intensive hot season that lasts from December until February.

Population
In 1991, the national population census estimated the district population at about 47,600. The national census in 2002 estimated the population of the district at approximately 51,800. The average annual population growth rate has been determined at 0.9%, between 2002 and 2012. In 2012, the population of Abim District was estimated at approximately 56,500. The table below illustrates how the district population has grown during the first decade of the 21st century. All figures are estimates.

Economic activities
Subsistence agriculture and animal husbandry are the main occupations of the population of the district. Many also practice animal hunting to supplement their diet. Crops grown include:

See also

References

External links
 Museveni Orders the Relocation of Abim District Headquarters

 
Karamoja
Districts of Uganda
Northern Region, Uganda